Amanda Brown (born October 6, 1970) is an American novelist who wrote the novel Legally Blonde which was the basis for the 2001 film and 2007 musical of the same name.

Biography
Amanda Brown was born in Phoenix, Arizona as the youngest of four siblings to Jack E. Brown, a lawyer, and Suzanne J. Brown, an art gallery owner. Brown graduated from Arizona State University in 1993. She then proceeded to study at Stanford Law School (never actually receiving a J.D. degree), where she compiled funny letters and stories based on her experiences into a first manuscript that would become the novel Legally Blonde (published 2001). She is married to Justin Chang.

Following the success of the 2001 film, Brown released her second book, Family Trust (2003), which was also optioned for a film.

Books
 Legally Blonde. AuthorHouse, 2001.
 Family Trust. New York: Dutton, 2003.
 School of Fortune, co-authored with Janice Weber. New York: St. Martin's Griffin,  2007.

References

External links

1977 births
Living people
Arizona State University alumni
20th-century American novelists
American women novelists
Writers from San Francisco
Stanford Law School alumni
21st-century American novelists
20th-century American women writers
21st-century American women writers
Novelists from California